Platyzygaena moelleri is a species of moth of the family Zygaenidae. It is found in 

Procridinae
Moths described in 1890